Henry Maitland Clark (11 April 1929 – 24 March 2012) was a Northern Irish colonial administrator and politician.

Background
Relatives of James Chichester-Clark, Clark's family had been settled in Upperlands in County Londonderry for generations, where they owned a substantial linen mill.  Clark, the younger brother of sailor and writer Wallace Clark, was educated at Shrewsbury School, Trinity College Dublin and Trinity Hall, Cambridge. He served with the Colonial Service on coming down from Cambridge and was appointed becoming a District Officer in Tanganyika, where he later served as District Commissioner.

Parliament
In 1959 Clark resigned from the Colonial Service to enter Parliament as Ulster Unionist MP for Antrim North. Throughout Clark's time in Parliament, the Ulster Unionists received the Conservative whip, though retaining an independent identity and Council, and Clark sat on the Government, and later Opposition, benches with Conservative MPs from Great Britain. Clark chaired the Conservative MPs' East Africa Committee in 1963-65 and was a part of the British Parliamentary delegation to the Council of Europe and the Western European Union from 1962 to 1965.

Clark's background in the Colonial Service and his abiding interest in East Africa led to his appointment as an electoral observer. He led the British delegation observing the election in Uganda in 1965 and was a member of the Commonwealth delegation observing the Mauritius election in 1967.

Defeat
At the 1970 general election, Clark lost his seat to Rev Ian Paisley of the Protestant Unionist Party. He became a wine merchant in 1972, giving up the business in 1976. From 1977 he was Assistant Controller of the Council for Small Industries in Rural Areas.
He married Penelope (d 1994), daughter of Group Captain Nicolas Tindal-Carill-Worsley and they had three children: Christabel (b 1973, m Dario Sbrocca), Camilla (b 1975, m Alasdair Spink) and Jamie (b 1979, m Kate Sinton). In later life he lived in Tisbury, Wiltshire, where he died on 24 March 2012.

References
 Who's Who of British MPs, vol. IV, Harvester Press, 1981.

1929 births
2012 deaths
People educated at Shrewsbury School
Alumni of Trinity College Dublin
Alumni of Trinity Hall, Cambridge
Ulster Unionist Party members of the House of Commons of the United Kingdom
Members of the Parliament of the United Kingdom for County Antrim constituencies (since 1922)
UK MPs 1959–1964
UK MPs 1964–1966
UK MPs 1966–1970
Colonial Service officers
Tanganyika (territory) people